András Sallay (born 15 December 1953) is a former ice dancer from Hungary. Competing with Krisztina Regőczy, he won a gold medal at the 1980 World Figure Skating Championships and a silver at that year's Winter Olympics. Sallay is the vice-president and managing director of IMG Hungary. He has two daughters, Nóra and Laura.

Results
(ice dance with Krisztina Regőczy)

Navigation

References

 
 László Rózsaligeti. Magyar olimpiai lexikon [Hungarian Encyclopedia of the Olympics]. Budapest: Datus. 2000. 

1953 births
Living people
Hungarian male ice dancers
Figure skaters at the 1976 Winter Olympics
Figure skaters at the 1980 Winter Olympics
Olympic figure skaters of Hungary
Olympic silver medalists for Hungary
Olympic medalists in figure skating
World Figure Skating Championships medalists
European Figure Skating Championships medalists

Medalists at the 1980 Winter Olympics